Mage Wam Atha aka Pickpocket (My Left Hand) is a 2002 Sri Lankan Sinhala drama film directed by Linton Semage and co-produced by Linton himself with Harsha Caldera with financial support funded by National Film Corporation of Sri Lanka. It stars Linton Semage himself with Dilhani Ekanayake in lead roles along with Gayani Gisanthika and Mahendra Perera. Music composed by Pradeep Ratnayake. It is the 1165th Sri Lankan film in the Sinhala cinema.

Plot

Cast
 Linton Semage as Kamal
 Dilhani Ekanayake as Kamal's wife
 Gayani Gisanthika as Amena
 Sanet Dikkumbura as Toy seller
 Saumya Liyanage as Kamal's boss
 Mahendra Perera as Photographer
 Seetha Kumari as Wife's Mother
 Giriraj Kaushalya as Boss's henchman
 Anjula Rajapakse as Wife's sister
 Sarath Kothalawala as Farook
 Mali Jayaweerage
 Chamila Peiris
 Dimuthu Devapriya

International screening
 Locarno International Film Festival, Switzerland
 Fukuoka International Film Festival, Japan
 Pusan International Film Festival, Korea
 Calgary International Film Festival, Canada
 Oslo International Film Festival, Norway
 Rotterdam International Film Festival, Netherlands
 Kerala film festival, India

Awards
The film has won several awards worldwide.

 2000 Presidential Award for Best Actor - Linton Semage
 2000 Sri Lanka Film Critics' Forum Award for Best Actor - Linton Semage
 2000 Sri Lanka Film Critics' Forum Award for Best Cinematography - M. D. Mahindapala
 2000 Sri Lanka Film Critics' Forum Award for Best Director - Linton Semage

References

2002 films
2000s Sinhala-language films